Dizuga is a monotypic moth genus in the family Geometridae described by Warren in 1896. It is sometimes considered a synonym of Anisodes. Its only species, Dizuga recusataria, was first described by Francis Walker in 1863. It is found in Australia.

References

Sterrhinae
Monotypic moth genera